Abacheri is a coastal town in south-eastern Eritrea. It is located by the Red Sea in the Southern Red Sea region.

Populated places in Eritrea